BOFFO is a nonprofit arts community and organization in Fire Island Pines, New York. Since 2009, BOFFO has presented the work of 700+ artists across a breadth of disciplines to share and perform work during the summer months. The multidisciplinary organization has aspects of both an artist residency program, with workshops and artist lectures, and a performance festival. At the end of each summer, the program hosts the Boffo Fire Island Performance Festival, which showcases experimental dance, performance, and music. Previous BOFFO residents include Jeremy O'Harris, Robert Yang, Puppies Puppies, Ryan McNamara, Malik Gaines and Alexandro Segade, Precious Okoyomon, and House of Ladosha.

About 
BOFFO was founded in 2010 by architect Faris Al-Shathir. In its earlier days, the organization paired designers, like Nicola Formichetti, with interdisciplinary artists, like Gage/Clemenceau, to create thoughtful pop-up art installations.

For BOFFO's inaugural season in 2012, curated by Cay Sophie Rabinowitz, the organization invited such artists as Whitney Biennial participant K8 Hardy and MoMA PS1 2010 Greater New York participant Ryan McNamara. Guest lecturers included architect Charles Renfro and art historian Douglas Crimp. In 2019, playwright Jeremy O'Harris hosted a one-night revival of Water Sports; or Insignificant White Boys (2015), the first script written by the artist.

Notable Participants 

Tyler Ashley
Math Bass
Boychild
Hannah Black
Meriem Bennani
Jonathan Lyndon Chase
TM Davy
DIS
Queer Ecology
Nicole Eisenman
House of Ladosha
Gogo Graham
K8 Hardy
Lyle Ashton Harris
Jeremy O. Harris
Kia LaBeija
Wardell Milan
Carlos Motta
Ryan McNamara
Raúl de Nieves
Puppies Puppies
Brontez Purnell
Ser Serpas
Casey Spooner
Ssion
Tabboo!
Telfar
Wu Tsang
Matt Wolf
Robert Yang
Young Boy Dancing Group

References

External links 

 

Fire Island, New York
Non-profit organizations based in New York (state)
Arts organizations based in New York (state)